The Hero Passion Pro is a motorcycle made in India by Hero Motocorp. It is the successor of the Hero Honda Passion, which was launched in 2001.

Its graphics and colours were first refreshed in 2003 and it was rechristened Passion Plus. Its graphics were again updated in 2007 with black alloy wheels and an all-black engine. In 2008 Hero Honda passion plus was rechristened as Passion Pro with new graphics and new colors with self-start features. In 2010 Passion got changed with the taillight and instrument consol. In 2012, the Passion X Pro was launched with new alloy wheels and front disc brakes.
 
It has  a  air-cooled, four-stroke single-cylinder engine. The chassis is a tubular double cradle type.
Although it is under , it is marketed as an executive class bike due to its styling and price. A Passion Pro and X Pro 110 were launched in 2018 with  engine.

Related bikes
Hero Honda Ambition 
Hero Honda Karizma R 
Hero Splendor 
Hero Honda Hunk 
Hero Honda Super Splendor 
Hero Pleasure 
Hero Honda Achiever  
Hero Honda CBZ 
Hero Honda Karizma 
Hero Honda Karizma ZMR

References

External links

Passion
Motorcycles introduced in 2001
Standard motorcycles